The 400 metres hurdles at the World Championships in Athletics has been contested by women since 1980 and by men since 1983.

The championship records for the event are 47.18 for men, set by Kevin Young in 1993, and 52.42 m for women, set by Melaine Walker in 2009.

Age records
All information from IAAF

Medalists

Men

Multiple medalists

Medals by country

Women

Multiple medalists

Medals by country

Finishing times

Top ten fastest World Championship times

See also
 400 metres hurdles
 400 metres hurdles at the Olympics

References

Bibliography

External links
Official IAAF website

 
World Championships in Athletics
Events at the World Athletics Championships